The Lost 45s with Barry Scott is an American classic hits retro music radio and interview program. It focuses on seldom played Top 40 hits from the 1970s and 1980s. The Boston Herald called it "the most successful weekend specialty show in Boston history".

History
The show has been on the air since 1981 starting at Emerson College, then at a series of Boston radio stations: WZLX, WBOS, Mix 98.5, 93.7 WEGQ, WODS Oldies 103.3, WROR and WPLM-AM-FM. It entered national syndication in 1993 and streamed online since 1999.

Segments on The Lost 45s with Barry Scott

Lost 45 Conversations: Scott has interviewed over 1,000 pop stars from late 60s through the 80s, who tell their stories behind the songs. 
Lost 45 Yearbook: Scott plays 5 songs that hit the Billboard Hot 100 from a certain year each week.
Rarities: Thousands of demos and rare versions of songs, some provided by the artists themselves. Includes lower charting 'shuddabeen' hits as requested often by listeners.
Lost Headlines: A look back at news stories from the late 60s through the 80s
TV Moments: Scott plays snippets of TV shows from the late 60s through the 80s
Movie Moments: Scott plays snippets of Movie from late 60s through the 80s
Lost 45 Box Set: Scott plays a group of themed based songs
Schoolhouse Rock Lessons: One Schoolhouse Rock! segment is presented.
Top 100 Lost 45s: During Labor Day Weekend Barry counts down the top 100 Lost 45 via listeners votes and requests.

The show's closing theme ("May Tomorrow Be a Perfect Day") is by Donny and Marie Osmond from their eponymous variety show.

References

External links
Lost45.com website

American music radio programs
1990s American radio programs